Thomas George Adames Baker (called Tom; 22 December 192025 September 2000) was an Anglican priest in the second half of the 20th century. He served as Dean of Worcester from 1975 to 1986.

Baker was born in Southampton.  He was educated at King Edward VI School, Southampton and Exeter College, Oxford and ordained in 1945. His first post was as a curate at All Saints, King's Heath after which he was  Vicar of St James' Church, Edgbaston.  He was then Sub-Warden of Lincoln Theological College then Principal of Wells Theological College.  In 1971 he became Archdeacon of Bath and four years later was appointed to the deanery of Worcester Cathedral where he served until 1986.

References

1920 births

2000 deaths

Clergy from Southampton

People educated at King Edward VI School, Southampton
Alumni of Worcester College, Oxford
Archdeacons of Bath
Deans of Worcester
Staff of Lincoln Theological College